Franco Bieler (born 6 December 1950) is an Italian former alpine skier. 

He is the cousin of the alpine skier Wanda Bieler but not relative with the other alpine skier Tiziano Bieller.

Career
During his career he has achieved 22 results among the top 10 (3 podiums + 1 in a parallel slalom in the Nation Cup of the World Cup 1976) in the World Cup.

He competed in the 1976 Winter Olympics.

World Cup results
Podiums

References

External links
 
 

1950 births
Living people
Italian male alpine skiers
Olympic alpine skiers of Italy
Alpine skiers at the 1976 Winter Olympics
People from Gressoney-Saint-Jean
Sportspeople from Aosta Valley
20th-century Italian people